The Du is a river mainly in northwestern Hubei Province, China with sources in Shaanxi Province. It is the principal right-bank tributary of the Han River. It is interrupted by the Pankou and Huanglongtan Dams.

References

Rivers of Hubei